Maurice "Mo" Watson Jr. (born March 8, 1993) is an American basketball player for CSO Voluntari of the Liga Națională. He played college basketball for both Boston University and Creighton.

High school career
Watson played for Boys' Latin of Philadelphia Charter School from 2008-2012, where he was a four-year starter. He led the team to the Philadelphia Public League title game in his senior year, and to a semi-final loss in the Pennsylvania 4A Boys Basketball Tournament.  He remains the all-time scoring leader at Boys’ Latin, as he passed Wilt Chamberlain to post a career total of 2,356 points, second in Philadelphia Public League history. In addition to many local honors, he was a Parade All-American.

College career
Watson Jr. played for Boston University in his first college season, 2012–2013. Here, he averaged 11.2 points, 5.4 assists and 1.7 steals per game in his freshman season. In 2014, he transferred to Creighton where he had a redshirt season. In his second season with Creighton, Watson Jr. averaged 14.1 points and 6.5 assists. In the 2016–2017 season, Watson Jr. suffered from a torn ACL which kept him out for the remainder of the season after playing just 19 games.

College statistics

|-
| style="text-align:left;"| 2012–13
| style="text-align:left;"| Boston University
| 30 || 30 || 29.5 || .463 || .329 || .750 || 3.3 || 5.4 || 1.7 || 0 || 11.2
|-
| style="text-align:left;"| 2013–14
| style="text-align:left;"| Boston University
| 35 || 33 || 31.2 || .495 || .337 || .628 || 3.6 || 7.1 || 2.1 || 0 || 13.3
|-
| style="text-align:left;"| 2015–16
| style="text-align:left;"| Creighton
| 35 || 34 || 31.4 || .475 || .297 || .714 || 3.4 || 6.5 || 1 || 0 || 14.1
|-
| style="text-align:left;"| 2016–17
| style="text-align:left;"| Creighton
| 19 || 19 || 29.9 || .508 || .469 || .692 || 2.6 || 8.5 || 1.5 || 0 || 12.9
|- class="sortbottom"
| colspan=2 style="text-align:center;"| Career
| 119 || 116 || 30.6 || .484 || .341 || .698 || 3.3 || 6.7 || 1.6 || 0 || 12.9

Professional career
On July 27, 2018, Watson Jr. signed his first professional contract with ZZ Leiden of the Dutch Basketball League (DBL). On November 10, Watson scored a DBL season-high 22 points in a 82–87 loss to Landstede. On March 31, Watson won the NBB Cup with Leiden. He scored 17 points in the cup final. Watson finished the season as league leader in assists and was subsequently named a member of the All-DBL Team.

On July 20, 2019, Watson signed with Forlì 2.015 of the Italian Serie A2 Basket.

Watson spent the 2020-21 season in Turkey with Budo Gemlik and averaged 19.4 points, 4.7 rebounds, 8.9 assists and 2.1 steals per game.

On August 7, 2021, he signed with Twarde Pierniki Toruń of the Polish Basketball League. In 12 games, Watson averaged 17.6 points, 10.9 assists, 4.7 rebounds and 1.9 steals per game. 

On November 29, 2021, he signed with Maccabi Rishon LeZion of the Israeli Basketball Premier League. On April 5, 2022, he was released from the team, due to "behavior that does not suit the club's values".

On July 8, 2022, he has signed with  Telent Antwerp Giants of the BNXT League.

Personal life
In February 2017, Watson was accused of sexual assault by a 19-year-old female student. The charges against him were dropped in September after his accuser's credibility was suspect, but he pled no contest to a different assault charge.

References

External links
Cregighton Bluejays bio

1993 births
Living people
American expatriate basketball people in Italy
American expatriate basketball people in the Netherlands
American expatriate basketball people in Poland
American expatriate basketball people in Turkey
American men's basketball players
Antwerp Giants players
Basketball players from Philadelphia
Boston University Terriers men's basketball players
B.S. Leiden players
Dutch Basketball League players
Creighton Bluejays men's basketball players
Maccabi Rishon LeZion basketball players
Parade High School All-Americans (boys' basketball)
Point guards
Twarde Pierniki Toruń players